Worofla is a town in western Ivory Coast. It is a sub-prefecture and commune of Séguéla Department in Worodougou Region, Woroba District.

In 2014, the population of the sub-prefecture of Worofla was 44,821.

Villages
The thirty villages of the sub-prefecture of Worofla and their population in 2014 are:
 Kohimon (1 632)
 Massala (390)
 N'gonwo (570)
 Séhéla (317)
 Worofla (1 791)
 Yamonzo (881)
 Bagabasso (1 177)
 Bananigoro (84)
 Bangana (991)
 Béhéma (2 333)
 Bonna (242)
 Dabala (470)
 Dougougbè (825)
 Gbémazo (1 381)
 Gbétogo (9 125)
 Gbimanan (4 208)
 Kangana (744)
 Karaba (1 107)
 Kato (2 551)
 Kéyé (344)
 Kognimasso (342)
 Kondogo (626)
 Kouégo (3 045)
 Lohou (2 519)
 Mankono (1 576)
 Monso (283)
 Soko (2 777)
 Tiéma (1 120)
 Yanfissa (359)
 Zogbogba (1 011)

Notes

Sub-prefectures of Worodougou
Communes of Worodougou